Ustronie Morskie is a PKP railway station in Ustronie Morskie (West Pomeranian Voivodeship), Poland.

Train services
The station is served by the following services:

 Intercity services (IC) Łódź Fabryczna — Warszawa — Gdańsk Glowny — Kołobrzeg
Intercity services (TLK) Kołobrzeg — Gdynia Główna — Warszawa Wschodnia — Kraków Główny
Regional services (R) Słupsk — Koszalin — Kołobrzeg
Regional services (R) Kołobrzeg — Koszalin
Regional services (R) Kołobrzeg — Koszalin — Białogard — Szczecinek — Piła Główna — Poznań Główny
Regional services (R) Koszalin — Kołobrzeg — Goleniów — Szczecin Główny

References 

Railway stations in West Pomeranian Voivodeship
Kołobrzeg County